The Cambridge Accord was an attempt to reach agreement on at least the human rights of homosexual people, notwithstanding controversy within the Anglican Communion about Anglican views of homosexuality.

It was published in the wake of the controversial Resolution 1.10 passed at the Lambeth Conference of 1998, which stated that "homosexual practice" is "incompatible with Scripture". The Cambridge Accord was published in October 1999 from the Episcopal Divinity School at Cambridge, Massachusetts and circulated for adoption by bishops of the Anglican Communion.

The Cambridge Accord proposed that:

Its author was the Right Reverend Steven Charleston, President and Dean of the Episcopal Divinity School, Cambridge, Massachusetts.

Signatories
Nineteen Anglican bishops in the UK signed up to the Cambridge Accord, including Rowan Williams, who later became Archbishop of Canterbury.

Four bishops in the UK expressly declined to sign: George Carey, who was Archbishop of Canterbury at the time of Lambeth Resolution 1.10 in 1998 and at the time of the Cambridge Accord itself; David Hope, who was then Archbishop of York and was alleged to be gay in 1995 by an OutRage! outing campaign; the Anglo-Catholic Eric Kemp; and John Sentamu, who later became Archbishop of York.

References

External links

 Full text of the Cambridge Accord

Canon law of the Anglican Communion
LGBT and Anglicanism